Woodhouse Park tram stop was a proposed Metrolink tram stop on the phase 3b plans to Manchester Airport. It was due to open in 2016 but was dropped from plans. The tram stop would have served the Woodhouse Park area of Wythenshawe in Greater Manchester.

References
 https://web.archive.org/web/20110716213530/http://www.tfgm.com/pdfmaps/metrolink_phase3.pdf

Proposed Manchester Metrolink tram stops